Stephanie Martin, sometimes credited as Stéphanie Martin, is an American–Canadian singer-songwriter and actress having performed in notable musical productions in both French and English. She is best known for her role as Éponine in three productions of the musical Les Misérables and as the Québécoise French singing voice of Pocahontas in the 1995 Disney animated film Pocahontas.

Life and career 
Stephanie Martin was born in the US where she spent the first six years of her life. She is a dual Canadian-American citizen. The family then moved to Beaconsfield, Quebec where, as a child, Stephanie sang with both parents in Montreal's Donovan Chorale. She participated in the Diocesan Folk Music Camp for youths held at Camp Kinkora located in Saint-Adolphe-d’Howard, Quebec. She began performing publicly in her mid-teens in Montreal.

Stephanie Martin played the role of Éponine in Les Misérables for 3 consecutive years starting with the bilingual Montreal production in 1991 that led to the Paris production of Les Misérables in 1991–1992 followed by the London production in 1992–1993. This aforementioned production of Les Misérables in Paris won the 1992 Molière Award for Best Musical.

Stephanie Martin has performed with symphony orchestras across North America, Europe and Asia. She is a core member of Jeans 'n Classics developed by Peter Brennan. Stephanie has toured North America with Jeans 'n Classics singing with symphony orchestras in programs of classic rock. Stephanie has participated in a United Nations Show Tour for Canadian peacekeeping troops in Lahr, Zagreb and Sarajevo. There, Stephanie delivered a peace package from Quebec elementary school children. In 1995 and 1996, she toured 11 cities in Japan with the Francis Lai Music Orchestra International Tour under the direction of Raphael Sanchez.

Stephanie has numerous acting and singing credits in both Television and Film. She was heard announcing as the French "Voice of God" during the opening and closing ceremonies of the 2015 Pan American and Para Pan American Games held in Toronto.

Stephanie Martin has released 2 original music albums and 1 single. The albums shape line & harmony in 2007 and April Snow in 2016 were both co-written and produced by Juno Award winner Chad Irschick. The single SAILING ON was co-written with Diane Leah and produced by Dave Pickell.

Stephanie Martin has resided primarily in Toronto, Ontario with husband Andrew Sabiston since they met in 1994 during the Toronto musical production of Napoleon at the Elgin Theatre.

Community involvement 

Stephanie Martin has contributed to fundraising events for organizations bringing awareness to missing people. She performed at the Bring Christina Home Fundraising Gala in 2008 and can be heard on the lead track of the Missing Children's Network benefit CD entitled Help us Find the Children.

Stephanie Martin was a committee member of Toronto's BIKESTOCK 2014, an organization promoting cycling safety in Toronto founded by Albert Koehl.

Stephanie Martin has been a guest singer at the Metropolitan Community Church of Toronto (MCC Toronto). Stephanie has recorded a version of her song Walk in the Light with noted musical director Diane Leah and the choir of MCC Toronto for their music album These Old Walls. Walk in the Light was the working title of her musical album, funded by Kickstarter backers, released March 30, 2016 as April Snow.

Discography

Original music studio albums

Original music studio single

Musicals; cast recording credits

Animation feature

Theatre productions

Animation features credits – singer

Television

Series and television film credits – actress

Series credits – singer/back-up vocalist

See also 
 List of Canadian musicians

References

External links 
 stephaniemartin.ca Official website
 

20th-century American actresses
21st-century Canadian actresses
20th-century American singers
American emigrants to Canada
American women singer-songwriters
American singer-songwriters
American musical theatre actresses
American voice actresses
Actresses from Montreal
Actresses from Toronto
Canadian women singer-songwriters
Canadian singer-songwriters
Canadian musical theatre actresses
Canadian voice actresses
French-language singers of Canada
French-language singers of the United States
Living people
Musicians from Toronto
Year of birth missing (living people)
People from Beaconsfield, Quebec
Singers from Montreal
20th-century American women singers
20th-century Canadian women singers